HMS Suffolk was one of 10  armoured cruisers built for the Royal Navy in the first decade of the 20th century. Upon completion she was assigned to the 3rd Cruiser Squadron of the Mediterranean Fleet and was then assigned to the 5th Cruiser Squadron in the Mediterranean in 1909 after a lengthy refit. She returned home for another refit in 1912 and became the flagship of the 4th Cruiser Squadron on the North America and West Indies Station in 1913.

After the beginning of World War I in August 1914, Suffolk became a private ship and searched for German commerce raiders while protecting British shipping. She captured a German merchantman shortly after the war began. She remained in the Atlantic until she became flagship of the China Station in 1917  In late 1918 the ship was deployed to Vladivostok to support the Siberian Intervention during the Russian Civil War. She returned home in 1919 and briefly became a training ship before she was sold for scrap in 1920.

Design and description
The ships were designed to displace . They were powered by two 4-cylinder triple-expansion steam engines, each driving one shaft using steam provided by 31 Belleville boilers. Suffolk, however, reached  during her sea trials.

The Monmouth-class ships' main armament consisted of fourteen breech-loading (BL)  Mk VII guns. Four of these guns were mounted in two twin-gun turrets, one each fore and aft of the superstructure, and the others were positioned in casemates amidships. Six of these were mounted on the main deck and were only usable in calm weather. Ten quick-firing (QF) 12-pounder 12-cwt guns were fitted for defence against torpedo boats. Suffolk also carried three 3-pounder  Hotchkiss guns and two submerged 18-inch (450 mm) torpedo tubes.

Beginning in 1915, the main deck six-inch guns of the Monmouth-class ships were moved to the upper deck and given gun shields. Their casemates were plated over to improve seakeeping. The twelve-pounder guns displaced by the transfer were repositioned elsewhere. At some point in the war, a pair of three-pounder anti-aircraft guns were installed on the upper deck. 
 
The armour of the gun turrets, their barbettes and the casemates was four inches thick.

Construction and service

Suffolk, named to commemorate the English county, was laid down at Portsmouth Royal Dockyard on 25 March 1901 and launched on 15 January 1903. She was completed on 21 May 1904 and was assigned to the 3rd Cruiser Squadron of the Mediterranean Fleet. In October 1904 Captain (later First Sea Lord) David Beatty assumed command until he returned home in late 1905. The ship returned home in 1907 for a lengthy refit. She returned to the Mediterranean in 1909 and was assigned to the 5th Cruiser Squadron. She began another refit at Devonport Royal Dockyard in October 1912. When it was completed in February 1913, she became the flagship of Rear Admiral Sir Christopher Craddock's 4th Cruiser Squadron on the North America and West Indies Station.

After the start of the war, Cradock transferred his flag to the faster and more heavily armed  while Suffolk remained in the Atlantic hunting for German raiders. She captured a German merchant ship on 8 August and remained in the Atlantic until August 1917 when she became flagship of the China Station. She became a private ship in November 1918 and deployed to Vladivostok to support the Siberian Intervention against the Bolsheviks. Suffolk returned home in 1919 and became a cadet training ship before she was listed for sale in April 1920. The ship was sold for scrap on 1 July and broken up in 1922 in Germany.

Notes

Footnotes

Bibliography

External links

 

Monmouth-class cruisers
Ships built in Portsmouth
1903 ships
World War I cruisers of the United Kingdom